American singer-songwriter Michael Jackson (August 29, 1958 – June 25, 2009) is regarded as one of the most significant cultural figures of the 20th century and one of the most successful and influential entertainers of all time. Often referred as the "King of Pop", his achievements helped to complete the desegregation of popular music in the United States and introduced an era of multiculturalism and integration that future generations of artists followed. His influence extended to inspiring fashion trends and raising awareness for social causes around the world.

Jackson became a child star in 1969 as the lead singer of the Jackson 5, a band formed with his older brothers. The group were recognized by US Congress for their contribution to American youth culture, and Jackson was embraced by the American public to a degree not afforded a child star since Shirley Temple in the 1930s. In the early 1980s, Jackson became a dominant figure in popular culture and the first African-American entertainer to have a strong crossover fan base on music television. His music videos, including those for "Beat It", "Billie Jean", and "Thriller" from his 1982 album Thriller, are credited with breaking racial barriers and transforming the medium into an art form and promotional tool. The popularity of these videos helped bring the television channel MTV to fame. Jackson's success at this time was credited with rescuing the music industry from its late-1970s recession, and revolutionizing it by initiating a marketing focus on blockbuster albums and video presentation.

Through his videos and live performances, Jackson popularized street dances, particularly his signature move the moonwalk, and attracted a cult of impersonators throughout the world. He is credited with helping to spread dance to a global audience and having an influence comparable to dance icons such as to Fred Astaire and Sammy Davis Jr. With an aesthetic borrowed from the musical film tradition, the Thriller videos created a subindustry of choreographers as other pop artists sought to produce sophisticated dance-oriented promotional films. In the 1980s, Jackson's personal idiosyncrasies and changing appearance became the source of fascination for the tabloid media, a phenomenon furthered by the child abuse accusations leveled against him in 1993. These eccentricities and controversies inspired a wealth of pictures and other artworks exploring his public image, which were presented in the 2018 exhibition Michael Jackson: On the Wall at London's National Portrait Gallery.

Jackson influenced a wide range of subjects, from celebrity studies to visual culture to gender and sexuality studies, and many more including ones not directly related to his profession. According to a study published in The Journal of Pan African Studies in 2010, his influence extended to academia, with references to the singer in literature concerning mass communications, psychology, medicine, engineering and chemistry. The British Council named Jackson on their list of "80 Moments that Shaped the World" with regard to international cultural relations.

Performing arts

Music

As the lead singer and youngest member of the Jackson 5 from the late 1960s, Michael Jackson was the group's focal point for the media. They became one of the most popular family acts in pop music, with many hit records, a self-titled cartoon series and, from 1976, a self-titled variety show. He and his brothers were widely viewed as role models for contemporary society; the press celebrated them as a family founded on core religious beliefs and a strong work ethic, and in 1972 the Jackson 5 received a commendation from US Congress in recognition of the brothers' contribution to American youth culture. Amid this recognition, according to the editors of Rolling Stones Encyclopedia of Rock & Roll, Jackson captivated the nation on a level not seen in a child star since Shirley Temple in the 1930s.

Author Peter Doggett describes the pre-teen Jackson as "America's most instinctive soul singer" and the reason that, aided by Motown founder Berry Gordy's presentation of the group, the Jackson 5 surpassed contemporaries such as the Osmonds to become the foremost sibling act. Gordy instilled in Jackson an ambition to make crossover, chart-topping, universal music during Jackson's time at the label. His musical influences varied widely, from the R&B of his father's band to Western classical. With the combination of artistic diversity and mass appeal, Jackson's achievements as a musician have defined a category of contemporary popular music that is characterized by fusions of different eras, styles, media and genres, but is also rooted in R&B and soul music.

The album Off the Wall was generally categorized as a disco album, yet music critic Rob Sheffield described it as one that "invented modern pop as we know it". The album has been called a turning point and a distillation of the disco era. According to musician and journalist Bob Stanley, Off the Wall presented Jackson as "a new kind of alpha male" with "an air of super-confidence" reminiscent of Elvis Presley before the latter's army service. The album's commercial success ensured that Jackson's standing surpassed that of the Jackson 5.

In the description of author and pop culture critic Joseph Vogel, Jackson's 1982 album Thriller changed the direction of popular music. Jay Cocks, writing for Time magazine in 1984, said the album was "a thorough restoration of confidence, a rejuvenation [and] its effect on listeners, especially younger ones, was nearer to a revelation". It reintroduced black music to mainstream American radio; until then the so-called "restrictive special-format programming", a genre-driven radio content philosophy which segregated music by race introduced in the mid-1970s, limited airplay of black music. Jackson, whose success was compared to that of Elvis Presley and the Beatles, appeared on the cover of Time. The album established Jackson as the world's top entertainment star and, in Stanley's recollection, "you'd expect to see a copy in the corner of any room, in any town, in any country in the world." Its unprecedented commercial success also provided the model for record companies recovering from the economic downturn of the late 1970s, whereby they focused on promoting a blockbuster album at the expense of releases by their lesser-known acts. Amid his description of the cultural phenomenon that Jackson represented in 1984, Cocks deemed him "A one-man rescue team for the music business ... A singer who cuts across all boundaries of taste and style, and color too." In 2008, the Library of Congress added Thriller to the National Recording Registry for its "stratospheric national and international success".

Jackson's music has been extensively covered by other artists of various styles, including Mariah Carey, Miles Davis, Willie Nelson, and Alien Ant Farm. Artists who often mention Jackson in their music include Kanye West, Lil Wayne, LL Cool J, Rick Ross, and Drake. According to Edmondson, writing in 2013, Jackson "redefined the term pop star" and his cultural legacy is reflected "in the very landscape of the modern, genre-crossing, multimedia pop music scene".

Dance and choreography

From the start of his performing career, Jackson incorporated dance moves into a stage presence that invited comparison with James Brown, Sammy Davis Jr., Mick Jagger and Tina Turner. He went on to popularize street dances such as popping, locking, the robot and his signature move the moonwalk. Professor of performance studies at NYU Tavia Nyongo said that "No dancer has done as much to popularize the art form since Fred Astaire."

Jackson first performed the moonwalk when miming to "Billie Jean" at the close of the Motown 25 TV special, which aired in May 1983. The performance was viewed by an international audience of around 50 million and, according to Rolling Stone, "energize[d] the music scene once again and set in motion all the forces that would go on to shape the popular culture of the 1980s". Media studies academic Jaap Kooijman writes that, although the moonwalk was an additional element in his routine at Motown 25, Jackson's replication of his dancing from the already popular "Billie Jean" music video presented a new phenomenon whereby a concert performance involved re-creating a video sequence and the music, including live vocals, ceded to visual imagery such as dance.

Jackson is credited with helping to spread dance to a global audience. Nigel Lythgoe, executive producer and judge on the TV dance competition So You Think You Can Dance, said that "countless" applicants had begun dancing because of Jackson. Ronni Favors, a director at the Alvin Ailey American Dance Theater, said Jackson was "a trailblazer for his generation", setting the expectation that future pop stars, such as Britney Spears and Beyoncé, integrate dance in their performances. In Japan, as a result of him opening his 1987–89 Bad World Tour there, Jackson is credited with reshaping J-pop's choreography. He also influenced India's Bollywood film scene, where dance sequences, films and soundtrack music all borrowed heavily from Jackson's work.

Following the singer's death in 2009, Andy Gill of The Independent said that through Jackson's example, "the Eighties became the decade of dance stars like Prince and Madonna, neither of whom would have been able to establish themselves as quickly as they did had Jackson not moonwalked across the room and kicked down the door for them." Gill added that with thousands of dancers imitating his moves in the moonwalk and the zombie, Jackson became "the most significant mainstream dance icon since the mid-century heyday of Fred Astaire, Gene Kelly and Sammy Davis Jr." Jackson was posthumously inducted into the National Museum of Dance and Hall of Fame in 2010.

Music videos

Jackson had a lasting influence on the music video medium, starting with the clips for his Thriller singles "Billie Jean" and "Beat It". At the time most music videos had small budgets, low production values and little narrative. Jackson's videos began a transformation, replacing low-budget montage promos with elaborate short films consisting of in-depth narratives and sophisticated visuals, and taking the form of a mini musical. Jackson collaborated with several Hollywood directors on these works, including John Landis, Martin Scorsese, Spike Lee and John Singleton. "Beat It" featured unusually sophisticated choreography and, according to The Rolling Stone Encyclopedia of Rock & Roll, created a "music video subindustry of dancers and choreographers" such as Paula Abdul and Toni Basil.

The "Thriller" video—which gained a commercial release as Michael Jackson's Thriller—was unusually long (at 15 minutes) and took the form of a short film presentation. It features Jackson dancing with zombies and cost more than $1 million to produce. The film sealed MTV's position as a cultural force, helped disassemble racial barriers for black artists, revolutionized music video production, popularized the making-of documentaries, and drove rentals and sales of VHS tapes. It has been described as the most influential music video in history; according to Edmondson, the "Thriller" video "is credited with single-handedly revolutionizing the landscape of pop music". Former MTV executive Nina Blackwood said, "[After 'Thriller'] we saw videos get more sophisticated—more story lines, way more intricate choreography. You look at those early videos and they were shockingly bad." Music video director Brian Grant credited "Thriller" as the turning point when music videos became a "proper industry". Gill recognized the Landis-directed film as a work that "altered forever the balance of sound and vision in the entertainment industry", adding: "Prior to Jackson, music alone had been the premier conduit of cultural dissemination among young people; after Jackson, it was merely the accompaniment to a dance routine, one small element in a larger spectacle." In December 2009, the video was inducted into the National Film Registry.

With MTV's initial broadcast of the film, in December 1983, the debut of a new Jackson video became a major media event. MTV's belated support signaled the end of its rock-only policy and, due to the popularity the film gained for the network, of concerns for its commercial survival. Bob Pittman, MTV's co-founder and CEO, said that "'Thriller' brought people to MTV for the first time, and it made them stay and watch it again and again. Now everybody was into MTV." This development ensured an upswing in the economics of the music industry after its sharp decrease in revenue since the late 1970s and, with the expansion of MTV's reach in 1984, new music stars being created through the video medium as well as established acts such as Bruce Springsteen embracing high-production music videos. The Rolling Stone editors state that Jackson's breakthrough was the "turning point" for MTV, initiating a transformation in which the network "not only revolutionized virtually every aspect of the music business, from promotion to concert tours, but changed the way listeners/viewers related to music and to artists".

According to The Rolling Stone Encyclopedia of Rock & Roll, the $160,000 budget for Jackson's "Beat It" video was considered an "exorbitant" amount; the video for his 1995 single "Scream" cost an estimated $4 million, making it the most expensive clip in pop music history at that time. According to Landis, the "Thriller" video project was the subject of a course at Harvard Business School, although he said this study incorrectly highlighted the role of business and legal professionals rather than Jackson's creative vision. MTV's premiere of Jackson's "Black or White" single was broadcast simultaneously in 27 countries on November 14, 1991, and was watched by an estimated 500 million people. As of 2006, this remained the largest audience to view a music video.

"Thriller" has become closely associated with Halloween. The dance is performed in major cities around the world; the largest zombie dance included 12,937 dancers, in Mexico City. A YouTube video of more than 1,500 prisoners performing the dance had attracted 14 million views as of 2010.

Fashion

The Rolling Stone editors describe Jackson as "one of the most intriguing personas (sic) in popular music, at once childlike and obsessed with control" and comment on his ubiquitous presence, "spotlit in his trademark red zippered jacket and white sequined glove". Jackson often asked tailors to make him clothes that defied convention. His defiance led to a notable style that includes sequined gloves, a fedora, red leather jackets, sequined jackets, aviator sunglasses, black high-waisted pants, white socks, and leather penny loafers. Jackson was also interested in British royalty and military history, which resulted in his adoption of regalia and military jackets. His jackets often had a single-colored armband on one sleeve. At the height of his fame, Jackson inspired fashion trends around the world. British Vogue called him "a fashion pioneer [...] who gave new meaning to moonwalking, immortalised solitary, sparkly gloves, initiated the trophy jacket trend in the Eighties and was brave enough to couple dress with Madonna on the red carpet".

Others have been influenced by Jackson's fashion sense. In 2012, Lady Gaga named Jackson as an inspiration. She owns around 400 pieces from his personal collection. In 2016, she wore Jackson's jacket from his 1990 visit to the White House at Hillary Clinton's final campaign rally during the 2016 U.S. presidential election. Also in 2016, Beyoncé honored Michael Jackson at Super Bowl 50 by wearing a Jackson-inspired outfit, a black and gold military jacket similar to the one Jackson wore in his Super Bowl halftime show in 1993.

Visual arts

Jackson has been depicted by a large number of contemporary artists, including Jeff Koons, Michael Craig-Martin and Grayson Perry. The silkscreen image of Jackson used on the cover of Time in 1984 was created by Andy Warhol. The final portrait Jackson commissioned before his death, by Kehinde Wiley, portrayed him as Philip II of Spain in the manner of a painting by Pieter Paul Rubens.

In June 2018 the National Portrait Gallery in London opened an exhibition titled Michael Jackson: On the Wall, featuring art inspired by Jackson and created by many leading artists. The curators stated that Jackson was "the most depicted cultural figure in visual art". The exhibition included the Warhol and Wiley pieces, and culminated in a 2005 film by Candice Breitz in which 16 young people are shown dancing to "Thriller". Guardian art critic Adrian Searle wrote that the singer's eccentricities and the common characterizations of him as "Ariel of the ghetto", a modern-day Baudelaire and Frankenstein's monster had provided artists with a wealth of imagery to explore in their work, and that as a muse he was "an inspiration, a model, a tragedy".

Sculptures

Sculptures of Michael Jackson are, or have been on display around the world. The 10 Amazing Statues of Michael Jackson Around the world; 9 Michael Jackson Statues You Won’t Believe!

1. Guangzhou Sculpture Park Michael Immortalised In China
 Bronze.  Lifesize.  Dedicated January 1, 2011. 
 Guangzhou Sculpture Park in the Baiyun District of Guangzhou City, China.

2. Michael with Bubbles
 Porcelain. (42 x 70.5 x 32.5 in) By the American artist Jeff Koons in 1988

The artist's proof and three copies were made: 
 The artist's proof is owned by the Broad Art Foundation of businessman and art collector Eli Broad and is displayed in the Los Angeles County Museum of Art  (It is now at The Broad Museum in Downtown Los Angeles). 
 One copy was sold at Sotheby's on May 15, 2001.
 The 2nd is in Oslo in the Astrup Fearnley Museum of Modern Art 
 The 3rd copy is in the San Francisco Museum of Modern Art.

3. Italian Amusement Park, Rainbow Magicland Italy
 White.  Unveiled at Magicland Theme Park, Valmontone, Rome on Michael’s 55th anniversary, August 29, 2013. The statue was created by Italian artist Luca Izzo and Thai artist Jusana Hopas.

4. McDonald’s Parking lot, Best, The Netherlands
 Sony built 9 32-foot tall statues of Michael Jackson wearing bandoliers to advertise for the ‘HIStory’ album. 
 The statues were placed in strategic locations in Europe in 1995.  Some statues were dismantled and others may be in storage. One has remained standing in a McDonalds’ parking lot in Best, The Netherlands.

5. Local park. Mistelbach, Austria Michael Jackson Statue in Austria gets protection
 Created by Daniel Kartakova, erected in 2009, weights 300 kg . "Smooth Criminal" attire.

6. Tuen Mun Temple Michael Jackson Statue in Tuen Mun, Hong Kong
 Created by Alex To. Life size copper. Unveiled on Oct 7 '09. It is in the compound of Shan Yuan Temple, Tuen Mun, Hong Kong.

7. Madonna and Child Another Jacko statue enrages fans
 Created by Swedish-born artist Maria von Kohler, it was is mounted in a window at The Premises Studios, a music studio in east London.

8. Jackson as Abe Lincoln
 Fiberglass, larger than life, in the style of in front of the Hard Rock Café & Hotel, Batu Ferringhi, Penang Island.  Styled after the Abraham Lincoln Memorial, the statue is white, wearing long coat, extravagant shirt, waistcoat, & sunglasses.

9. Football Museum
Plaster and resin.  Commissioned by Mohamed Al-Fayed.  Originally unveiled in 2011 outside Craven Cottage, the ground of Fulham Football Club of which Al-Fayed was chairman. It was removed by new Fulham chairman Shahid Khan in 2013 and moved to the National Football Museum in Manchester in 2014. It was removed from display in 2019.

10. Brazilian Favela Michael’s Lookout – Santa Marta Favela, Rio de Janeiro
 On the day after Michael’s death (June 25, 2009), the mayor of Rio promptly announced that a memorial would be created for him in Rio. It was  inaugurated in 2010 in Santa Marta favela, Rio de Janeiro, Brazil

Race politics

Early in his career, Jackson and his family were often portrayed in the press as having risen out of black ghetto culture. This stereotype reinforced their standing as role models for American youth but, as a fabrication by Motown's publicity department, it displeased the family. To many African-Americans, his youth and energy were a source of inspiration in the aftermath to Martin Luther King's 1968 assassination, at a time when the country's black-power and civil rights movements were in disarray. Jackson became a notable figure in the desegregation of US popular culture and music. Off the Wall succeeded at a time when disco was perceived as inferior to rock by critics. According to Vogel, one of the album's significant achievements was to integrate a diverse collection of talents from different races, cultures, and countries, and to coalesce them seamlessly into the record.

"Billie Jean" was one of the first music videos by a black artist to be shown on MTV, which hitherto had been a channel directed toward a white, rock-oriented audience. Although the song was already a number one hit on the Billboard charts, MTV initially refused to play the video because of the network's commitment to rock music. When CBS Records executive Walter Yetnikoff threatened to remove all of their products off MTV and expose its discriminatory policies, the network gave in. According to Edmondson, "The video [for 'Thriller'] is often cited as the musical phenomenon that completed the racial integration of popular music begun in the rock 'n' roll era."

The success of Thriller not only broke down racial barriers in music but also in other areas of contemporary society. Critic Greg Tate said, "Black people cherished Thrillers breakthrough as if it were their own battering ram [against] apartheid." Civil rights activist Al Sharpton commented, "Way before Tiger Woods or Barack Obama, Michael made black people go pop-culture global." He also attributed Obama's presidential win to "a process that Michael helped America graduate to" as crossover fans and imitators grew up to become voters. To some commentators in the 1980s, however, Jackson had betrayed his African-American roots, especially in his musical collaborations with former Beatle Paul McCartney—a point of criticism that Stanley says Jackson sought to address with his 1987 album Bad.

The video for "Black or White" showed Jackson dancing with dancers of various ethnic groups and traditions, and the lyrics plead for racial tolerance and understanding. In early 1993, he launched a $1.25 million program to assist children affected by the 1992 Los Angeles riots and, in a TV interview conducted by Oprah Winfrey, discussed issues related to his African-American heritage and the abuse he suffered under his father. The viewer ratings for the show were among the highest in the history of US television.
 
In 1995 "They Don't Care About Us" was released as one of the singles from HIStory.  In the mid-2010s, the track was used as an anthem for the Black Lives Matter movement. The song, originally recorded as part of the Dangerous sessions, was inspired by the Rodney King beating, which had led to the 1992 LA riots. The lyrics became more personal after Jackson felt dehumanized by the Santa Barbara County police's behavior during the investigation into the child sexual abuse accusations brought against him in 1993.

"They Don't Care About Us" attracted controversy over its supposedly antisemitic lyrics. Bernard Weinraub of The New York Times cited the lines "Jew me, sue me / Everybody do me / Kick me, kike me / Don’t you black or white me" as "pointedly critical of Jews". Rabbi Abraham Cooper of the Simon Wiesenthal Center described the lyrics as "deeply disturbing" and potentially harmful to young people. Jackson issued statements saying that his lyrics were about "the pain of prejudice and hate" and that the song was "a way to draw attention to social and political problems". He described himself as "the voice of the accused and the attacked". The lyrics were eventually edited out with muffles.

Tabloid media

At the height of his fame, during the 1980s, Jackson began to embrace and perpetuate the public perception of his strangeness. Jackson (and his publicity team) and the media worked in tandem to cultivate this image. Early tabloid stories of his being obsessed with the Elephant Man's bones and sleeping in an "oxygen chamber" were possibly publicity stunts. Around this time, the tabloid newspaper The Sun began nicknaming Jackson "Wacko Jacko", a name he came to despise. Other tabloids and media outlets soon followed. The nickname stayed with Jackson for the rest of his career. Stories about him gradually turned negative. In Vogel's description: "Critics maligned him for buying the Beatles catalog [in 1985], mocked his changing appearance, called him a sissy, questioned whether he actually wrote his songs, reduced his art to commercial ephemera." His marriage to Lisa Marie Presley and rumours of him undergoing skin-whitening and other cosmetic surgery furthered the controversy surrounding Jackson's image and made him the subject of sensationalist biographies.

Writing in British Vogue in 1987, Barney Hoskyns said that Jackson occupied a "superstar stratosphere of his own" and part of the public's misunderstanding of the star was "because we so want to know him – as we want to know anyone that famous". Hoskyns described the tabloid image of Jackson as "despicable ... distortions", but nevertheless opined: "Michael Jackson represents a terrible, pitiful corruption of what a twenty-nine-year-old human being really should be ... His neurotic obsession with perfecting his physical appearance apparently knows no bounds. And his inability to enjoy meaningful relations with anyone except animals, small children and cartoon characters has become ridiculous. This is, in short, a singularly maladjusted young man." The Rolling Stone editors also attribute the media speculation partly to the singer's elusiveness and obsession with privacy, and add: "the massive public soul-searching the [1993] allegations against Jackson inspired were but one indication of the almost inestimable role he has played in shaping not only pop music but pop culture."

Scholars have described the widely acknowledged and often polarizing perception of Jackson as a postmodern spectacle, causing the "real Michael Jackson" to remain elusive. In an article for Popular Music & Society, Brian Rossiter commented: "The media, aware of the marketable potential of Jackson's ambiguities, consistently used them to manufacture the notion of an authentic or private self behind his public persona. […] Audiences were always given liberty to select which Michael Jackson they deemed to be the real or authentic one […]."

Susan Fast, writing for the same publication, gives a more sympathetic view of Jackson: "While some of [his] difference was demonstrated through what was viewed in the mass media as 'eccentric' behavior […] it was really his more substantive(sic), underlying differences that were most troubling—racial, gendered, able-bodied/disabled, child/teenager/adult, adult man who loved children, father/mother." She writes that Jackson's persona was "so unsettling to the hegemonic order that it had to be contained through ridicule, misinterpretation, sensationalism, and finally criminal indictment". It is generally regarded as unusual for a man to want to be a single parent, Fast continues, to adore children like a mother; the thought of a man obsessed with cosmetics and appearance agitated the public to disbelieve the idea of him being an object of heterosexual desire. Fast argues that such perceptions, which stemmed from anxieties of masculinity, despite the fact that he created highly heterosexual art like "Black or White" and "In the Closet"; and that this idea extended to the public perception of Jackson's alleged child molestation.

Global impact
Ben Beaumont-Thomas, music editor for The Guardian, said Jackson "ushered in a global culture" and that his impact extended into "areas previously untouched by Western pop culture". At the 1989 Soul Train Music Awards, actress Elizabeth Taylor dubbed Jackson the "King of Pop, Rock & Soul". In the coming years, Jackson declared himself to be the "King of Pop", a moniker that was widely accepted as accurate.

In Africa
Jackson first visited Africa in 1974 with the Jackson 5, a visit that inspired his Bad single "Liberian Girl". Along with Jackson compositions such as "Heal the World" and "We Are the World", fans from Liberia found the song uplifting and his message resonated there in a climate of civil war and human atrocities.

In 1992, Jackson carried out a five-nation African cultural tour, intent on visiting "orphanages, children's hospitals, churches, schools and playgrounds". While in Côte d'Ivoire, he was crowned king of the Agni people in the Kingdom of Sanwi. Later that year, he established the Heal the World Foundation to raise awareness of social issues related to children. In 2016 John Dramani Mahama, then President of Ghana, referred to "Heal the World" in a speech at the U.N. General Assembly to encourage globalization and acceptance of refugees, and to denounce xenophobia.

Until 1994, with the fall of apartheid in South Africa, Jackson was the only artist whose songs were played on white pop stations and black R&B stations there. According to Metro FM presenter Lupi Ngcayisa, his lyrics "forced black families to debate issues surrounding individualism and race". South African R&B artist Loyiso Bala, of the Bala Brothers, likened Jackson's impact to Nelson Mandela and said that as a black boy growing up in a township, "you either wanted to be Michael Jackson or a freedom fighter."

In Brazil
In 1996 Jackson visited Santa Marta, a favela in Rio de Janeiro, to film one of the videos for "They Don't Care About Us". Initially, Rio's local government was concerned that Jackson would show the world an unflattering picture of poverty, which might affect tourism, and accused Jackson of exploiting the poor. Others supported Jackson's wish to highlight the problems of the region, arguing that the government was embarrassed by its own failings. A judge banned all filming but this ruling was overturned by an injunction.

Speaking of the music video in The New Brazilian Cinema, Lúcia Nagib commented: "When Michael Jackson decided to shoot his new music video in a favela of Rio de Janeiro [...] he used the favela people as extras in a visual super-spectacle [...]. The interesting aspect of Michael Jackson's strategy is the efficiency with which it gives visibility to poverty and social problems in countries like Brazil without resorting to traditional political discourse. The problematic aspect is that it does not entail a real intervention in that poverty." In 2009, Billboard described the area as "now a model for social development" and claimed that Jackson's influence was partially responsible for this improvement.

Influence on other performers
Jackson has been named by many artists across multiple genres as a major musical inspiration. Beyoncè named him her major musical influence. Aged five, Beyoncė attended her first ever concert where Jackson performed and claims to have realized her purpose. When she presented him with a tribute award at the World Music Awards in 2006, Beyoncè said, "if it wasn't for Michael Jackson, I would never ever have performed." During her performance at the Super Bowl 50 halftime show, she paid tribute to Jackson-inspiredoutfit similar to the one Jackson wore during his 1993 Super Bowl halftime performance.

In 2012, Lady Gaga named Jackson as an inspiration. She owns around 400 pieces from his personal collection. In 2016, she wore Jackson's jacket from his 1990 visit to the White House at Hillary Clinton's final campaign rally, during the 2016 U.S. presidential election.

Chris Brown has cited many artists as his inspirations, predominantly Michael Jackson. Brown emphasizes "Michael Jackson is the reason why I do music and the reason I am an entertainer." Furthermore, Brown has stated "There isn't an artist out now who hasn't been influenced or inspired by Michael Jackson. When I was 2 years old in diapers, I sang and danced to Michael Jackson. Michael Jackson is as close to perfection as an artist can be."

Justin Timberlake has named Jackson as one of his biggest influences stating "to create the things he created with his music is untouchable. He opened the mind of the world to be able to do that through music... it's a feat not accomplished by many people, maybe only a handful of people. I don't think anyone ever did it like him".

Usher has, on many occasions named Michael Jackson as his biggest influence. Usher once told MTV, "He influenced me in so many ways, more than music . ... as a humanitarian, as a philanthropist, as an artist, as an individual who transcended culture. I wouldn't be who I am today without Michael Jackson." On another occasion, Usher said "Mike is the truth and you can never deny the truth. That great choreography and great energy that Michael puts behind it [entertainers] try to re-create that feeling. I try to take different kinds of dance and apply it in the same way Michael did in 'Thriller,' 'Beat It' and 'Off the Wall.'" Usher has also stated, "You can't say you are an artist in this century and wasn't inspired by Michael ... and I'm always gonna remember. I'll be a fan for life." During a television special 'Michael Jackson: 30th Anniversary Special', Usher was able to dance with Jackson while performing "You Rock My World".

Celine Dion is a Canadian singer, whose recordings since her debut have been mainly in English and French, although she has sung in Spanish, Italian, German, Latin, Japanese, and Chinese. She cites Michael Jackson as a major motivation for her to learn English as early as the 1980s. She realized that her potential was far from realized. After seeing Jackson and being inspired by his performance when she was still just 18, Celine announced to her manager that she wanted to be a megastar like Michael Jackson.

In 2012, Justin Bieber said, "music is music, and I'm definitely influenced by Michael Jackson and Boyz II Men and people who were black artists - that's what I like." Bieber has also cited Jackson as his biggest musical influence. In an interview, Bieber also said "he's an icon" and said "Every time I go out and perform, I'm always trying to be the best and that's what he always did... And there's never gonna be another Michael Jackson as long as anyone lives. I think that he's just incredible and it's an honor to be here."

Bruno Mars has stated, "because the details, the attention to detail he did on everything he was a part of, you can look at what made him so iconic, the glove, the hat, the dancing, the music videos, the way he sang when he sang, everything he did was Michael Jackson and just kind of stamped that on the world."

Jason Derulo's music is generally pop, but also incorporates R&B and hip-hop influences. He predominantly names Michael Jackson as his inspiration. Derulo states "He is the reason I am who I am today. When I was four years old, I saw him for the first time. I saw how he moved the crowd and how people were just so touched."

"Euphoria" star, actress, and singer Zendaya says she has always looked up to Michael Jackson." I’ve loved Michael Jackson since the minute I was born. He’s probably the most talented person ever. He was able to create such an amazing career and be probably the biggest star we’ve ever had. But also, never did he cuss in his songs. He always had a positive way of doing what he did. He had such a love for the art of music and tried to make people feel better through that."

South Korean band BTS has cited Jackson as a major influence. They were praised by Jackson's son, Prince Michael who said: "Obviously, they've taken huge influence from your dad like 'Dynamite', the choreography was very MJ influenced and... one of the latest songs 'Butter' started with 'smooth like butter, like a criminal undercover.' already getting that 'Smooth Criminal' reference in there."

The following artists are noted for being influenced by Michael Jackson:

 Akon
 Beyoncé
 Justin Bieber
 BTS 
 Mariah Carey
 Sean "Puff Daddy" Combs
 Chance The Rapper
 Jason Derulo
 Prabhu Deva
 Celine Dion
 Green Day
 Zac Efron
 Insane Clown Posse have cited Jackson as their biggest musical influence. 
 Janet Jackson
 Wyclef Jean
 Farah Khan
 Lenny Kravitz
 Sean Kingston
 Lady Gaga
 Adam Lambert
 Chris Brown
 Little Mix
 Ludacris
 Maroon 5
 Bruno Mars
 Janelle Monáe
 Ne-Yo
 NSYNC
 Paramore
 Hrithik Roshan
 Selena
 Britney Spears
 Chris Tucker
 Justin Timberlake
 The Weeknd
 Ashley Tisdale
 Usher
 Ciara
 Remo D'Souza
 Tiger Shroff
 Varun Dhawan
 Kanye West
 Zendaya

See also 
Michael Jackson games

Notes

References

Citations

Bibliography

 Brackett, David. "Black or White? Michael Jackson and the Idea of Crossover." Popular Music & Society 35, no. 2 (May 2012): 169–85. doi:10.1080/03007766.2011.616301.
 Broertjes, Andrew. "‘He's Sending His People Messages out of His Pain’: Michael Jackson and the Black Community." Popular Music & Society 36, no. 5 (December 2013): 677–98. doi:10.1080/03007766.2012.745336.
 
 Childs, Peter. "Pop Video: Michael Jackson's ‘Thriller’ and ‘Race’: Approach: ‘Race’ Studies." In Texts: Contemporary Cultural Texts and Critical Approaches. Edinburgh: Edinburgh University Press, 2006.
 
 
 Fast, Susan. "Difference That Exceeded Understanding: Remembering Michael Jackson (1958–2009)." Popular Music & Society 33, no. 2 (May 2010): 259–66. doi:10.1080/03007761003640574.
 Flory, Andrew. I Hear a Symphony: Motown and Crossover R&B. Ann Arbor: University of Michigan Press, 2017. 
 Harper, Phillip Brian. "Synesthesia, "Crossover", and Blacks in Popular Music." Social Text, no. 23 (1989). doi:10.2307/466423.
 Hidalgo, Susan, and Robert G. Weiner. "Wanna Be Startin' Somethin': MJ in the Scholarly Literature: A Selected Bibliographic Guide". The Journal of Pan African Studies, 3, no. 7. (March 2010): 14-28.
 
 Longhurst, Brian. Popular Music and Society. Polity Press, 2007. 
 Oliete, Elena. "Michael, Are You OK? You've Been Hit by a Smooth Criminal: Racism, Controversy, and Parody in the Videos 'Smooth Criminal' and 'You Rock My World'." Studies in Popular Culture 29, no. 1 (2006). 
 Roberts, Tamara. "Michael Jackson's Kingdom: Music, Race, and the Sound of the Mainstream." Journal of Popular Music Studies (Wiley-Blackwell) 23, no. 1 (March 2011): 19–39.
 Roberts, Tamara, and Brandi Wilkins Catanese. "Michael Jackson in/as U.S. Popular Culture." Journal of Popular Music Studies (Wiley-Blackwell) 23, no. 1 (March 2011): 1–2. doi:10.1111/j.1533-1598.2010.01260.x.
 
 Rossiter, Brian. "‘They Don’t Care About Us’: Michael Jackson's Black Nationalism." Popular Music & Society 35, no. 2 (May 2012): 203–22. doi:10.1080/03007766.2011.618050.
 
 
 Vogel, Joseph. Man in the Music: The Creative Life and Work of Michael Jackson. Vintage, 2019. 
 Warwick, Jacqueline. "‘You Can’t Win, Child, but You Can’t Get Out of the Game’: Michael Jackson's Transition from Child Star to Superstar." Popular Music & Society 35, no. 2 (May 2012): 241–59. doi:10.1080/03007766.2011.618052.

External links

Michael Jackson
Cultural depictions of Michael Jackson
Jackson, Michael